Pachyschelus purpureus is a species of metallic wood-boring beetle in the family Buprestidae. It is found in North America.

Subspecies
These four subspecies belong to the species Pachyschelus purpureus:
 Pachyschelus purpureus azureus Waterhouse, 1889
 Pachyschelus purpureus bicolor Kerremans, 1894
 Pachyschelus purpureus purpureus (Say, 1833)
 Pachyschelus purpureus uvaldei Knull, 1941

References

Further reading

 
 
 

Buprestidae
Articles created by Qbugbot
Beetles described in 1833